The Latin Grammy Lifetime Achievement Award is an honor presented annually by the Latin Recording Academy, the same organization that distributes the Latin Grammy Awards, to commend performers "who have made contributions of outstanding artistic significance to Latin music". Award recipients are honored during "Latin Grammy Week", a string of galas just prior to the annual Latin Grammy Awards ceremony.

Since its inception, the award has been presented to musicians originating from Argentina, Brazil, Chile, Colombia, Cuba, the Dominican Republic, Mexico, Peru, Portugal, Puerto Rico, Spain, the United States, Uruguay, and Venezuela.

The awards were first presented to Mercedes Sosa, José José, Roberto Carlos, Willie Colón, and Antonio Aguilar in 2004. José and Carlos were later honored as the Latin Recording Academy Person of the Year award in 2005 and 2015. Armando Manzanero, Linda Ronstadt, and Joan Baez have also been recipients of the Grammy Lifetime Achievement Award. Colombian musician Joe Arroyo is the only recipient to have posthumously receive the Latin Grammy Lifetime Award in 2011 following his death four months earlier. Upon receiving the Lifetime Achievement Award in 2014, Carlos do Carmo became the first artist from Portugal to win a Latin Grammy Award. The accolade, along with the Person of the Year and the Trustees awards, were not presented in 2020 due to the COVID-19 pandemic.

Recipients

 Each year is linked to an article about the Latin Grammy Awards ceremony of that year.

 The artists occupation(s) are listed on the Special Awards page on the Latin Grammy Award website.

See also

 Billboard Latin Music Lifetime Achievement Award
 Grammy Lifetime Achievement Award
 Latin Grammy Trustees Award
 List of Latin Grammy Awards categories
 List of lifetime achievement awards
 Lo Nuestro Excellence Award

References

Specific

General

External links

 Latin Grammy Awards

2004 establishments in the United States
Awards established in 2004
 
Lifetime achievement awards
Music-related lists
Latin Grammy Awards